Kevin Jolly (born 29 January 1958) is a former speedway rider from England.

Speedway career 
Jolly rode in the top tier of British Speedway from 1975-1990, riding for various clubs. He reached the final of the British Speedway Championship on three occasions in 1980, 1981 and 1982.

References 

1958 births
Living people
British speedway riders
Boston Barracudas riders
Ipswich Witches riders
King's Lynn Stars riders
Mildenhall Fen Tigers riders
Milton Keynes Knights riders
Peterborough Panthers riders
Swindon Robins riders
Wimbledon Dons riders
People from Eye, Suffolk